Netherby is a town in western Victoria, in Australia.

History
The town was originally known as Warraquil. The town takes its name from the British full-rigged ship Netherby, 944 tons, which was wrecked on King Island in Bass Strait on 17 July 1866. The ship was carrying 52 crew and 452 emigrants to Brisbane, Queensland and all hands landed safely. After the castaways were rescued and taken to Melbourne, few elected to continue on to Queensland, but many settled in the district of Victoria then being opened up that was named after their ship.

Netherby Post Office opened on 1 September 1886 and closed in 1975.

The railway came to Netherby in 1916, when the line to Yapeet opened. The last passenger service ran in the 1950s, and the line was closed in December 1986.

Notes

References

External links

   

Towns in Victoria (Australia)
Wimmera